Sir Charles William Clanan Marr  (23 March 1880 – 20 October 1960) was an Australian politician, engineer and soldier. He was a member of cabinet under prime ministers Stanley Bruce and Joseph Lyons, serving as Minister for Home and Territories (1927–1928), Works and Railways (1932), Health (1932–1934), and Repatriation (1932–1934). He was a member of the House of Representatives for over 20 years, representing the New South Wales seat of Parkes (1919–1929, 1931–1943). Prior to entering politics he was an officer with the Australian Imperial Force during World War I, winning the Distinguished Service Order and Military Cross for his service on the Mesopotamian campaign.

Early life and military career
Marr was born on 23 March 1880 in Petersham, New South Wales, the son of Ellen (née Nilson) and James Clanan Marr. His mother was born in Ireland and his father, a bootmaker, was born in Hobart. Marr was educated at Fort Street Model School, Newington College (1895) and Sydney Technical College, graduating as an electrical engineer.  He joined the state Postmaster-General's Department and transferred to the federal Postmaster-General's Department in 1901. He married Ethel May Ritchie in September 1905.  He took an early interest in radio broadcasting and developed this interest while in military service with the first Australian Imperial Force during World War I in Mesopotamia.  He received a Military Cross in 1917 and a Distinguished Service Order in 1918.

Political career
Marr commenced his political career by winning the Nationalist Party endorsement for the seat of Parkes from the incumbent Bruce Smith, and easily won the seat in the 1919 general election.

In October 1927, he urged the Australian parliament not to highlight the past mistreatment of indigenous Australians, in order to preserve the White Australia policy:

In 1929, as an honorary minister in the Bruce–Page Government, Marr was sent to represent Australia at the League of Nations. On the journey to Europe he developed a friendship with Amanullah Khan, the recently deposed king of Afghanistan; they conversed in French. He subsequently gave an account of their meetings to an Australian correspondent.

Marr lost the seat of Parkes to Edward McTiernan at the 1929 federal election. However, he regained Parkes at a 1931 by-election when McTiernan resigned to join the High Court of Australia and held the seat until 1943, initially as a Nationalist and later as a member of the United Australia Party.  Marr held a number of cabinet posts in the Bruce and Lyons governments, including Home and Territories, Works and Railways, Health and Repatriation.

Personal life
Marr died in the Sydney suburb of Pymble, survived by his wife, two sons and two daughters.  He was made a knight of the Royal Victorian Order in 1934 for his role in organising the Australian tour of the Duke of Gloucester.

Notes

Members of the Cabinet of Australia
1880 births
1960 deaths
People educated at Newington College
Members of the Australian House of Representatives for Parkes
Members of the Australian House of Representatives
Nationalist Party of Australia members of the Parliament of Australia
Australian Companions of the Distinguished Service Order
Australian Knights Commander of the Royal Victorian Order
Australian politicians awarded knighthoods
United Australia Party members of the Parliament of Australia
20th-century Australian politicians
Australian Ministers for Health